is a Japanese writer. He co-created the 1997 television anime series Revolutionary Girl Utena and its 1999 film sequel Adolescence of Utena as a member of the production group Be-Papas. He is also the editor-in-chief of the digital magazine Anime Style.

References

External links

1964 births
Japanese writers
Living people